The Cocoa Trees is a retail chain store of chocolate and confectionery brands based in Asia. It is a brand of Focus Network Agencies (FNA) Singapore, a former subsidiary of ABR Holdings. The company is the largest distributor and retailer of chocolate and confectionery products in Asia, with more than 70 stores in the Asia-Pacific region. It also operates 12 chocolate and confectionery shops at Singapore Changi Airport. In 2014, FNA secured tenders to operate the departure lounges of Terminal 1 and 3. FNA also supplies and distributes chocolates to supermarkets in Singapore and overseas.

History 

FNA was founded in 1991 when the Duty Free Store Singapore (DFS) closed down their Chocolates Trading Division. Esther Loo, who was then the head of chocolate division at DFS, took over and started her own distribution company. The company started out with 5 staff and two agency lines: Hawaiian Host and Droste. In the same year, FNA posted a turnover of $1 million.

From 1991 to 1993, FNA acquired three more chocolate brands and opened of their first retail outlet, FNA Chocolate Boutique. Loo Lip Giam, current Group chief executive officer and husband of Esther Loo, joined the company in 1994. FNA Chocolate Boutique was renamed The Cocoa Trees in 2000.

In 2003, FNA received an investment sum of $5 million from ABR Holdings, which also owns the Swensen's ice cream franchise, and its partners. ABR Holdings sold their shares in 2012. In 2014, FNA received an undisclosed amount of investment from Heliconia Capital Management, an investment arm of Temasek Holdings. FNA plans to expand the chain abroad.

FNA's Regional Distribution (Travel Retail) Division has established a Pan-Asian distribution network. The Cocoa Trees has branches and outlets operating out of China, Hong Kong, India, Korea, the Maldives, Malaysia and Taiwan. The company also owns Cocoa and Co. and Choc Spot.

Retail stores 

Choc Spot and Cocoa & Co. are retail stores set up by The Cocoa Trees to target sub-urban malls in Singapore. Choc Spot stores are located at West Mall, Bedok Mall, Nex, Sembawang Shopping Centre, West Gate, Compass Point (Grand Final). Cocoa & Co operates five outlets in Singapore Changi Airport, selling candies and chocolates.

M&M's World Stores are also operated at Singapore Changi Airport terminals, supplying clothing and other goods branded with M&M's mascots and logos. In October 2011, FNA, Mars, Incorporated International Travel Retail (ITR) and Changi Airport Group (CAG) opened a 40-square metre M&M's store at Singapore Changi Airport's Terminal 1. In the following year, the group opened its flagship store at Changi Airport's Terminal 2 departure transit lounge.

Subsidiaries 

Hydro Style, founded in 2004 is Singapore's largest importer and distributor of designer European kitchen and bathroom supplies. Interiors Affairs, the retail arm of Hydro Style, was launched in 2010. Interiors Affairs sells the products carried by Hydro Style in its showroom.

Established in 2004, Global Vintage Network Pte. Ltd is a subsidiary company of FNA, and distributes wines in the region.

Awards and recognition 

Small Medium Enterprise (SME) Growth Excellence Company: The Singapore SME Growth Excellence companies are selected and ranked based on their audited financial figures, i.e. Sales/Turnover or Net Profit. The Cocoa Trees was awarded for their outstanding performance in 2007. In 2008, the Singapore SME 500 companies are selected and ranked based on their audited financial figures, i.e. Sales/Turnover or Net Profit. The Cocoa Trees was one of the companies mentioned.

Singapore 1000, SME 1000 and Singapore International100: Companies which have achieve the highest achievements in the quantities management are considered for this award. The judging panel will examine the financials and business profiles of the corporations or SMEs for the following elements, the nature of the company's core business, profile of the shareholdership and the ultimate shareholders, any recent/currently reported information that affects the standing of the company and adherence to corporate governance before awarding the nominated companies. There are sub-categories under the Categories of Singapore 1000, SME 1000 and Singapore International 100. FNA won the award in 2009 for Singapore 1000 under the sub category of Sales/Turnover Growth Excellence Award in 8 Industries.

Singapore Prestige Brand Award: The award was established in 2002 by the Association of Small and Medium Enterprises (ASME) and Lianhe Zaobao. Singapore Prestige Brand Award recognises and honours reputable Singapore brands. There are 5 main award categories: Promising Brands, Established Brands, Heritage Brands, Maybank Regional Brands and Special Merit. The Cocoa Trees brand won the Established Brands category in 2009.

The Ernst & Young Entrepreneur of the Year Award is a yearly awards program that recognises Singapore's top entrepreneurs for their economic contributions to the society. The winner is chosen based on 6 categories: entrepreneurial spirit, financial performance, strategic direction, innovation, global impact and personal integrity/influence.

Loo Lip Giam was awarded the overall winner of the EY Entrepreneur of the Year Award 2013 Singapore. He represented Singapore at Monaco, competing with 60 other EY country winners for the top prize.

Philanthropic work 

FNA has been actively involved in community projects and providing support for non-profit organisations. The company also provides students with internships.

The Cocoa Trees Endowed Bursary was established in 2014. The bursary aims to provide financial aid to undergraduates from the School of Economics at the Singapore Management University (SMU). Three bursaries are awarded per year.

References 

1991 establishments in Singapore
Retail companies of Singapore
Food retailers
Singaporean brands
Singaporean companies established in 1991